is an original video animation (OVA) anime series created and directed by Kazuya Tsurumaki, written by Yōji Enokido, and produced by the FLCL Production Committee, which consisted of Gainax, Production I.G, and King Records. FLCL is a story following Naota Nandaba, a twelve-year-old boy whose suburban life is disturbed by the arrival of the mysterious Haruko Haruhara. The six-episode series was released in Japan from April 2000 to March 2001 alongside a manga and novel adaptation.

In 2016, two new seasons totaling 12 episodes were announced as a co-production between Production I.G, Toho, and Adult Swim. The second season, FLCL Progressive, premiered on June 3, 2018 on Adult Swim's Toonami programming block, while the third season, FLCL Alternative, premiered on September 8, 2018. In Japan, Alternative and Progressive had theatrical screenings as compilation films with Alternative opening on September 7, 2018 and Progressive opening on September 28, 2018. The first episode of FLCL Alternative  premiered unannounced on April Fools' Day 2018 at 12 a.m. ET on Toonami in Japanese with English subtitles as part of Adult Swim's annual stunt.

Two additional seasons were ordered by Adult Swim in 2022, titled FLCL: Grunge and FLCL: Shoegaze, respectively. Both seasons will premiere in 2023.

Plot

The first season of FLCL is a coming-of-age story and revolves around Naota Nandaba, a 12-year-old, working-class boy living with his widower father and grandfather. His life in the city of Mabase is interrupted by the arrival of a Vespa-riding maniac named Haruko Haruhara. She runs over Naota then revives him with CPR before hitting him on the head with her left-handed, electric bass guitar (a blue, vintage Rickenbacker 4001) and proceeds to stalk him. Finding Haruko weaseling her way into his life as a live-in maid, Naota discovers that the head injury she caused created an "N.O." portal, which giant robots produced by a company known as Medical Mechanica emerge from periodically. The first of these robots is hit on the head by Haruko and becomes a friendly service robot later named Canti. Canti ingests Naota to assume the reddened form he first had when fighting the robots sent after him.

Haruko claims she is an alien investigator from the Galactic Space Police Brotherhood, and her presence places Naota and those around him in danger. The Interstellar Immigration Bureau's Commander Amarao, whom Haruko has a history with, asserts rather that she is an apathetic seductress seeking a space-manipulating being called Atomsk who was partially contained within Canti. Every time Naota is absorbed by Canti, Atomsk is gradually brought to Earth. As Atomsk is held in Medical Mechanica's custody and Haruko ultimately places Earth under threat, the company eventually turns their factory stationed on the planet into a doomsday terraforming device, attempting to have Naota and Canti absorbed by the doomsday device's Terminal Core. Haruko's plan fails as Naota ends up becoming Atomsk's host and then releases him into the universe after a brief battle that ends Medical Mechanica's attack on Earth. Haruko follows after Atomsk, and Mabase returns to some normalcy.

In the second season, FLCL Progressive, Haruko returns to Mabase years later after a failed attempt to contain Atomsk, although she did manage to absorb him. Placing herself as a middle school homeroom teacher, Haruko targets a 14-year-old girl named Hidomi Hibajiri through her classmate and eventual love interest Ko Ide. Haruko finds opposition in both the headphones Hidomi wears and Julia Jinyu, a more stoic offshoot of Haruko that splintered from her during her initial attempt to control Atomsk's power. Haruko eventually eats Julia to restore herself, and uses Ide to get to Hidomi. Like before, this causes conflict between Medical Mechanica and the Interstellar Immigration Bureau, as the latter was reverse-engineering Canti's technology to utilize the N.O. Channel's energies for their own use. Atomsk appears on Earth as planned, but Haruko ends up failing again with a freed Julia taking her leave. Haruko regains her composure and resumes her hunt for Atomsk as Hidomi and Ide begin their relationship while Mabase rebuilds after much of it was destroyed by Medical Mechanica.

In the third season, FLCL Alternative, Haruko enters the life of high school student Kana Koumoto and her friends as she became a mentor of sorts to Kana in helping the teen's transition into adulthood as Medical Mechanica begins its assault on Earth.

Production
The first season of FLCL was directed by Kazuya Tsurumaki and produced by the FLCL Production Committee, which included Gainax, Production I.G, and Starchild Records.

Tsurumaki has said that he tried to "break the rules" of anime when making FLCL, for example, by choosing a contemporary Japanese band to provide the soundtrack, and patterning the style more after "a Japanese TV commercial or promotional video", creating a work that is "short, but dense-packed".

FLCLs localization director and script writer Marc Handler stated that localization of the script was the hardest part of the show. The in-jokes in the show included obscure pop culture references that had to be decoded and transferred to English audiences. One example was a reference to Cheerio, a discontinued soft drink in Japan, for the English release the choice was made to use a discontinued American soft drink at the time, Crystal Pepsi. Director Kazuya Tsurumaki responded to criticism of FLCL, stating "comprehension should not be an important factor in FLCL".

The Medical Mechanica building featured is in the shape of a large iron. The character Amarao describes Medical Mechanica's goal as the destruction of all thought. FLCL uses the iron as a symbolic breakdown of "thought" by smoothing out the wrinkles as equated to the removing of the brain's wrinkles. For English localization, the Japanese team had to explain the concept because a direct translation of script did not convey the ideology.

Media

Original video animation

The six-episode series was released in Japan from April 26, 2000 – March 16, 2001. It originally debuted in the United States on Adult Swim in August 2003, where it managed to gain a significant cult following and was widely acclaimed, despite its short length. The series would continue to air on the network in the following years, including reruns on the network's Toonami programming block from October 2013 to January 2014, and in April 2018. The series is also available via iTunes, adultswim.com and Funimation's website.

Six DVD compilations, each containing one episode, have been released in Japan by Gainax. In addition, a DVD collection box, containing all six DVD compilations, was released in Japan on August 13, 2005. Three DVD compilations were released by Synch-Point in North America. A DVD collection box, containing all the DVD compilations of the English episodes, was released on January 23, 2007, but have since gone out of print. In January 2010, Funimation announced that they had acquired the license for the series and would be releasing it on DVD and Blu-ray Disc in February 2011. Shortly after, it has been released in Australia and New Zealand by Madman Entertainment on a 3-disc DVD set and on Blu-ray Disc.  It is also licensed in the United Kingdom by MVM Films. The series also aired in the United States on Cartoon Network's Adult Swim programming block from August 4 to August 13, 2003.

Novels 
A three-volume novel series was written by the anime's screenwriter, Yoji Enokido, illustrated by Kazuya Tsurumaki and Hiroyuki Imaishi, and published by Kadokawa Shoten. The novels were released in Japan in June 2000, October 2000, and March 2001 respectively. The English-language versions were published by Tokyopop and were released in North America on March 11, 2008; September 9, 2008; and March 10, 2009 respectively. The novels cover all 6 episodes of the anime, introducing elements that were not present in the original production.

Manga
A two-volume manga was created by artist Hajime Ueda. The manga interprets the series with certain elements altered and removed, and tells the events of the anime using a reductive art style and unsteady pacing. Jack Kotin defended the unique artstyle of the manga, saying "It can be crudely drawn at times, but this style fits in well with the overall story and atmosphere...".

The manga was published by Kodansha and serialized in monthly Magazine Z. The two volumes were released on October 23, 2000 and August 23, 2001 respectively. Jō volume was on May 7, 2007 and the Ge volume was released on June 4, 2007. An edited tankōbon version of the manga that was released in box sets, were released on January 10, 2012 and February 9, 2012 respectively.

The English-language editions of the manga was released by Tokyopop on September 16, 2003 and on November 4, 2003 respectively. In March 2011, Dark Horse Comics announced to re-release the manga in omnibus edition. The omnibus edition was released on May 16, 2012 and includes remastered story pages, a remastered script, and bonus color pages.

Soundtracks

Six pieces of theme music are used for the episodes; five opening themes and one closing theme, all by Japanese rock band The Pillows. The battle themes are "Advice", "Little Busters" and "I Think I Can"; the opening themes are: "One Life", used in episode one, "Instant Music" in episodes two and three, "Happy Bivouac" in episode four, "Runners High", in episode five, and "Carnival" in episode six. The closing theme of each episode is "Ride on Shooting Star", used during ending sequences in which appears Yukiko Motoya and a Vespa.

Geneon Entertainment has released three original soundtracks encompassing the songs by The Pillows, and the score by composer Shinkichi Mitsumune. The first soundtrack, titled , contains tracks featured in the first three episodes of FLCL. The soundtrack was released on October 4, 2000 in Japan and January 20, 2004 in the US. The second soundtrack, titled , contains tracks featured in the last three episodes of FLCL. The soundtrack was released on July 25, 2001 Japan and September 7, 2004 in the US. This volume features several audio dramas, with the cast of FLCL playing the various parts. Due to the dramas included, this album acts as a sequel of sorts to the anime. The third soundtrack, titled , is a compilation of the first two soundtracks, featuring only music by The Pillows. The released on June 8, 2005 and June 7, 2005 in the US. Unlike the previous two soundtracks, the songs are the original vocal versions from the band's LPs. A fourth album title  was released in September 2018 with music used in Progressive and Alternative.

Reception

FLCL has received a mostly positive reception. The series has been described as "bizarre" and "surreal", and has been noted for its symbolic content, unusual plot, and its soundtrack composed by The Pillows. Its experimental nature has also been noted, which includes an entire scene made in the cutout animation style of animated American series South Park, or The Matrix-like camera rotation tricks.

Christopher McDonald of Anime News Network called it "downright hilarious" and "visually superb" with great music, citing the packaging of 2 episodes per DVD as the only weakness of Synch-Point's original release. Robert Nelson of THEM Anime Reviews gave the anime 4 out of 5 stars, stating "FLCL may not have a straightforward or deep plot. It may not have complex characterizations. Hell, it may not have any meaning. But FLCL does succeed in its true objective. It is fun to watch!" Chris Beveridge of Mania gave it an A−, stating "FLCL is something that allowed those involved to try a wide variety of styles and techniques and does come off as quite experimental. But nearly everything worked in their favor and you end up with three hours of nearly break neck speed action, comedy and commentary on modern life." Brian Ruh praised the series, stating "It was very frenetic and kept pushing the envelope on what was possible in Japanese animation."

IGN columnist Davis Smith reviewed the anime shortly after its English premiere. In the article, Smith praised the series' unusual story telling, extremely high quality animation and the soundtrack provided by The Pillows; rewarding the series a score of 9 out of 10 concluding, "Logic dictates that FLCL should be an undisciplined and unaffecting mess, given all the insanity that its creators are attempting to weld into a functioning whole. Yet while it's hard to explain exactly why, it works. It entertains me. At times, it makes me laugh; at times, it makes me a little misty-eyed; at times, it makes me want to scream and howl and light things on fire and break windows with baseball bats and yes, maybe even buy a Vespa. That's the kind of success that you just can't argue with."

From January 3 to February 7, 2012, Hayden Childs, of the online magazine The A.V. Club, composed a six-part weekly analysis and review of each FLCL episode in celebration of The Legend of Korra's then upcoming third season, a series that was heavily influenced by FLCLs animation style. In the article, Childs gave an extremely positive review of the series, understanding it as a surrealist inspired coming of age story, stating "For all of its wild and initially bewildering aspects, the major purpose of FLCL is the impressionistic and often naturalistic documentation of Naota's passage into maturity."

Avatar: The Last Airbender director Giancarlo Volpe has stated members of his staff "were all ordered to buy FLCL and watch every single episode of it."

Chainsaw Man creator Tatsuki Fujimoto has stated in his 3 million copies sold thank you letter to fans that Chainsaw man is a "wicked version of FLCL".

Awards and acclaims
On August 12, 2003, a Time Warner press release noted the success of Cartoon Network: FLCL "ranked No. 42 among all shows on ad-supported cable among adults 18–34". Also in 2003, FLCL won third place for Best Animation Film at the Fantasia Festival. On February 24, 2007, FLCL was nominated for "Best Cast", and won "Best Comedy Series" and "Best Short Series" at the first American Anime Awards show. Anime Insider ranked FLCL 4th in their list of the best English-licensed anime of all time in November 2007.

Sequels
Anime News Network reported on August 31, 2015 that the production studio Production I.G may have been planning a remake of the popular series after announcing their purchase of the rights to FLCL from production company Gainax. This led many to speculate on the potential of a remake or possible continuation of the series.
According to Hideaki Anno, Anno's studio Khara was originally set to buy the rights to FLCL from Gainax. Before the deal was done however, Gainax suddenly raised the asking price causing the deal to fall though.

Neon Genesis Evangelion character designer Yoshiyuki Sadamoto designed the characters and Kazuya Tsurumaki, an assistant director on Neon Genesis Evangelion, served as director.

The synopsis of the series was published by Adult Swim:

FLCL Progressive, the sequel series, featured the return of original character designer Yoshiyuki Sadamato (as his respective role) and original series creator Kazuya Tsurumaki, who supervised the project. Hideto Iwai wrote the scripts, and Katsuyuki Motohiro served as chief director on the project, with each episode featuring a different director: Kazuto Arai, Toshihisa Kaiya, Yuki Ogawa, Yoshihide Ibata, Kei Suezawa, and Hiroshi Ikehata. The animation was produced mostly by Production I.G, but studios Production GoodBook and Signal.MD handled episodes 2 and 5, respectively. The Pillows contributed to the series soundtrack, although the score was primarily composed by R・O・N from music production company VERYGOO.

FLCL Alternative, the third season, once again saw the return of character designer Yoshiyuki Sadamoto, composer R・O・N (with tracks by The Pillows), scriptwriter Hideto Iwai, and supervisor Kazuya Tsurukamki. Katsuyuki Motohiro, as well, returned as chief director, although Yutaka Uemara was the only director, and Kiyotaka Suzuki served as assistant director. Production I.G, Revoroot, and NUT produced the animation for the series.

FLCL Progressive premiered on June 3, 2018 on Adult Swim's Toonami programming block and concluded on July 7, 2018; FLCL Alternative premiered on September 8, 2018 and concluded on October 13, 2018. In Japan, Alternative and Progressive had theatrical screenings on September 7, 2018, and September 28, 2018, respectively. The first episode of FLCL Alternative unexpectedly premiered early at midnight on April Fools' Day on Toonami, airing entirely in Japanese with English subtitles. The day of the second season's US premiere, Toonami simultaneously announced via its Facebook page that they would be delaying the English subtitled versions of both new seasons until November 2018, in respect for the Japanese film format releases. Warner Bros. released FLCL Progressive on DVD on October 1, 2019. It later released FLCL Alternative on DVD along with a Blu-ray combo pack of both sequels on February 4, 2020.

Two additional seasons were ordered by Adult Swim in 2022, which were announced on Toonami's 25th anniversary, titled FLCL: Grunge and FLCL: Shoegaze, respectively. Both seasons will premiere in 2023.

References

Notes

Further reading

External links

 FLCL at Funimation
  
 
 

2000 anime OVAs
2000 Japanese novels
2000 manga
2023 anime television series debuts
Action anime and manga
Adult Swim original programming
Animated television series about children
Animated television series about robots
Anime with original screenplays
Coming-of-age anime and manga
Dark Horse Comics titles
Extraterrestrials in anime and manga
Funimation
Gainax
IG Port franchises
Kodansha manga
Madman Entertainment manga
Music in anime and manga
NUT (studio)
Production I.G
Revoroot
Science fiction anime and manga
Seinen manga
Surreal comedy anime and manga
Television series set in the future
Toho Animation
Tokyopop titles
Toonami
Upcoming anime television series